Emma Biggs (born 1956) is a London-based mosaic artist and author of a number of standard textbooks on contemporary mosaic practice. Having recently completed a large public art project — "Made in England" — based on the visual culture and ideology of the pottery industry in Stoke-on-Trent (in the English midlands), her work has become increasingly concerned with the ceramic industry and its social history. As a fine artist Emma Biggs makes abstract paintings with her husband, Matthew Collings. The processes, formats and titles of the paintings also relate to her interest in material culture. She has written Mosaic Techniques (Cassell, 2003) and several other books co-authored with Tessa Hunkin, who joined her after she founded the London-based Mosaic Workshop in 1988. Mosaic Workshop have been responsible for a number of high-profile commissions including work for some of the chapels in London's Westminster Cathedral. She is a regular tutor of short courses in mosaic art at West Dean College, the study centre of the Edward James Foundation. She also lectures at City and Guilds of London Art School.

Books
 Mosaic Techniques, Cassel, 1999
 Stylish and Simple Mosaic, Emma Biggs and Tessa Hunkin, Aurum Press, 1998
 Mosaic Workshop, Emma Biggs & Tessa Hunkin, David & Charles, 1999
 Mosaics for the Home and Garden, Emma Biggs and Tessa Hunkin, David & Charles, 2001
 The Complete Book of Mosaics, Emma Biggs and Tessa Hunkin, Reader's Digest Association, 2005
 Mosaic Patterns, Emma Biggs & Tessa Hunkin, New Holland, 2006
 Garden Mosaics, Emma Biggs & Tessa Hunkin, New Holland, 2009

Artworks exhibited at Canary Wharf Art Trail, London
 Emma Biggs: Pattern for Democracy Canary Wharf Art Trail. Canary Wharf Group. Retrieved 21 February 2023.
  Emma Biggs: Sartor Resartus Canary Wharf Art Trail. Canary Wharf Group. Retrieved 21 February 2023.
  Emma Biggs: Wharf Walk Canary Wharf Art Trail. Canary Wharf Group. Retrieved 21 February 2023.

References

External links
http://www.emmabiggsmosaic.net/
http://www.emmabiggsandmatthewcollings.net
http://www.thepotteries.org/mosaic/index.htm
http://news.bbc.co.uk/1/hi/england/staffordshire/6207380.stm
http://public-art.shu.ac.uk/sheffield/big421im.html
http://www.thejoyofshards.co.uk/london/canary/index.shtml
https://web.archive.org/web/20070604150552/http://www.westdean.org.uk/index.htm
https://web.archive.org/web/20070807101803/http://www.westdean.org.uk/site/arts/gallery/mosaic/emma-biggs.htm
http://www.mosaicworkshop.com/

1956 births
Mosaic artists
English contemporary artists
Living people